...Where the Groupies Killed the Blues is the second album by progressive rock band Lucifer's Friend, released in 1972. Piano is prominent on most songs, and organ is used only on a few songs such as "Where the Groupies Killed the Blues", whereas on the debut album, Lucifer's Friend (1970), organ and guitars had been the driving force.

In the U.S., the band's U.S. label (Billingsgate Records) did not release this album although Billingsgate did issue the follow-up album, I'm Just a Rock & Roll Singer (1973).  The U.S. release of Groupies was delayed three years until the band's new label Passport Records released it.

Original LP Track listing

Side one
 "Burning Ships" (Hesslein, Horns, Lawton) – 4:34
 "Prince of Darkness" (Hesslein) – 5:37
 "Hobo" (Hesslein, Lawton) – 3:42
 "Mother" (Hecht) – 7:25

Side two
 "Where the Groupies Killed the Blues" (Hesslein) – 5:04
 "Rose on the Vine" (Hesslein) – 8:19
 "Summerdream" (Hecht, Hesslein) – 8:56

Later LP Reissues and CD Track Listing

Side one
 "Hobo" (Hesslein, Lawton) – 3:42
 "Rose on the Vine" (Hesslein) – 8:19
 "Mother" (Hecht) – 7:25

Side two
 "Where the Groupies Killed the Blues" (Hesslein) – 5:04
 "Prince of Darkness" (Hesslein) – 5:37
 "Summerdream" (Hecht, Hesslein) – 8:56
 "Burning Ships" (Hesslein, Horns, Lawton) – 4:34

Personnel
 John Lawton – lead vocals
 Peter Hesslein – lead guitars, vocals, percussion
 Peter Hecht – keyboards
 Dieter Horns – bass
 Joachim Rietenbach – drums

References

External links
 

1972 albums
Lucifer's Friend albums
Albums produced by Conny Plank
Vertigo Records albums
Passport Records albums